Eliyahu Ben Chaim (born August 4, 1940) is a Sephardi rabbi, Talmudic scholar, and Orthodox halachist. He is the Av Beit Din (head of the rabbinical court) of Mekor Haim in Queens, New York, and a prominent leader of New York's Sephardi Jewish community.

Early life 
Eliyahu Ben Haim was born in Jerusalem, Mandatory Palestine. His father was from Hamedan, Iran and his mother's father from the Hasidoff family of Georgia. In his youth, he studied at Yeshivat Porat Yosef, where he was recognized as a prodigy with a distinguished memory. He attended the shiur of Rabbi Ben Zion Abba Shaul and received semicha (rabbinic ordination) from Rabbi Ezra Attia and other rabbis. At the age of 17, he was tested on the entire Shulchan Aruch. In Porat Yosef, Rabbi Ben Haim fostered a close relationship with Rabbi Ovadia Yosef, who studied Even Ha'ezer with him.

Community work 
In 1962, at the age of 22, he was appointed maggid shiur at Yeshiva Beth Harashal in Jerusalem. Five years later, he became the rosh yeshiva of that yeshiva. In 1973 he began teaching at the Lifshitz Teachers Seminary in Jerusalem. In 1975 he was sent by the Jewish Agency to serve as a rabbi in Tehran, where he hosted Rabbi Ovadia Yosef during his historic trip to Iran. In Tehran, Ben Haim began serving the local community of Mashadi Jews as a rabbi.

In 1979, in the wake of the Iranian Revolution, he went with his family to the United States and served as the chief rabbi of the Mashadi Persian Jewish community of Long Island (UMJCA). Since 1993, he has lectured at Yeshivat Rabbeinu Yitzchak Elchanan (RIETS) at Yeshiva University.

Ben Haim was considered a close friend of Mordechai Eliyahu and delivered many eulogies for him. Ben Haim runs the Beth Din Mekor Haim, where he addresses the needs of the Queens Jewish community in matters of marriage, divorce, conversion, civil law, and kosher supervision. He also runs a kollel affiliated with the Beth Din.

Beliefs 
Rabbi Ben Haim, like his teacher, Ovadia Yosef, advocates using the Kochah DeHeterah (power of leniency) to assist every Jew in need, especially agunot, women whose husbands refuse to provide a get (Jewish bill of divorce).

Works 
Ben Haim's students have released publications containing his rulings. They include:
 Shenot Haim: Laws and Customs of Mourning in Accordance with the Mashadi Jewish Tradition, by Rabbi Mosheh Aziz and Avraham Ben-Haim, Independent Publisher, Nov 21, 2018, 
 טהרת חיים: Laws and Customs of Family Purity in Accordance with the Sephardic Jewish Tradition, by Rabbi Mosheh Aziz, September 1, 2020,

References

External links 

 Lectures at Yeshiva University
 Kashrut website
 Welcoming Rabbi Izchak Yosef

1940 births
Israeli emigrants to the United States
Living people
Orthodox rabbis from New York City
American Sephardic Jews
20th-century American rabbis
21st-century American rabbis